Johann Siegwald Dahl (16 August 1827, Dresden - 15 June 1902, Dresden) was a German animal painter.

Life and work
He was one of nine children born to the Norwegian painter, Johan Christian Dahl and his first wife Emilie. Of those, only he and one sister survived to adulthood. His first art lessons came from his father.

After three more years attending the Dresden Academy of Fine Arts, he paid a visit to London to study with Edwin Landseer; another famous animal painter. He also spent some time in Paris. He became an honorary member of the Gemäldegalerie Alte Meister in 1864.

His best known works involve Norwegian motifs, inspired by his father's works and numerous visits to Norway, but he also created some portraits. His works may be seen at several museums in Dresden and Hanover.

His sister Caroline was married to the Norwegian cabinet minister, Anders Sandøe Ørsted Bull.

Sources 
 Meyers Konversations-Lexikon, 4th edition, 1888-1890
 Biography from Salmonsens konversationsleksikon @ Projekt Runeberg

External links

 More works by Dahl @ ArtNet

1827 births
1902 deaths
19th-century German painters
19th-century German male artists
German painters of animals
Artists from Dresden
German people of Norwegian descent